Saensatharn P.K. Saenchai Muaythai Gym (born August 21, 1993), also known as Saensatharn Sor Suradej, is a Thai Muay Thai fighter from the Khon Kaen province of Thailand. He is a former Lumpinee Stadium Light Welterweight Champion and World Muaythai Council World Welterweight Champion.

Saensatharn currently competes for the Thai Fight promotion, with whom he has won a title in 2017.

Muay Thai career
On May 19, 2016, Saensatharn defeated Dylan Salvador in Paris by decision to win the WMC World Welterweight Championship.

2017
Saensatharn made his Thai Fight debut at THAI FIGHT Samui 2017 on April 29, 2017, facing Isuzu Cup Tournament winner Aroondej Petsupapan in the 2017 Isuzu Cup Superfight. He went on to win a three-round decision, landing himself a multi-fight deal with the Thai Fight promotion.

On December 23, 2017, Saensatharn defeated Walid Otmane at THAI FIGHT Chiang Mai in the semi-finals of the 2017 Thai Fight 70 kg King's Cup Tournament.

On January 27, 2018, Saensatharn defeated Naimjon Tuhtaboyev at THAI FIGHT Bangkok 2017 to become the 2017 THAI FIGHT 70kg Champion.

2018
Saensatharn continued his run of dominance in 2018, winning 6 of his 7 fights in the 2018 Thai Fight schedule by knockout. One of his highlights included a brutal one-punch knockout of Hosein Nasiri at THAI FIGHT Chiang Rai on October 27, 2018. He would later be entered into his second consecutive Thai Fight King's Cup Tournament, this time the 2018 Thai Fight 70 kg Kard Chuek King's Cup Tournament.

On November 24, 2018, Saensatharn defeated Ruslan Ataev by second-round knockout at THAI FIGHT Saraburi in the Thai Fight 70 kg Kard Chuek Tournament Semi-Final.

He was set to face Sasha Moisa in the 2018 Thai Fight 70 kg Kard Chuek Tournament Final at THAI FIGHT Nakhon Ratchasima on December 22, 2018. However, Saensatharn was forced to withdraw from the fight due to an injury, resulting in Moisa winning the tournament via forfeit.

He began his THAI FIGHT career undefeated at 15–0 (9 KOs), including going 6–0 (3 KOs) in 2017 and 8–0 (5 KOs) in 2018.

2019
After opening 2019 with a first-round KO victory over Kurtis Allen, Saensatharn suffered his first loss in THAI FIGHT to Sasha Moisa at THAI FIGHT Mueang Khon 2019 on March 30, 2019, losing by first-round KO.

He returned on June 29, 2019 at THAI FIGHT Betong to face David McCarthy, where he won via second-round technical knockout via doctor stoppage.

2020
Following a 15-month hiatus, Saensatharn returned to action on September 19, 2020 at THAI FIGHT New Normal, facing Andi Uustalu. He was able to win via third-round technical knockout via doctor stoppage.

On October 17, 2020, he defeated Iranian Thai Fight veteran Mohammad Hossein Doroudian at THAI FIGHT Begins by second-round knockout with a knee to the body.

On November 7, 2020, Saensatharn defeated Herbert Kinscher by first-round technical knockout at THAI FIGHT Korat 2020.

On November 28, 2020, he defeated Ruslan Ataev at THAI FIGHT Pluak Daeng by second-round knockout via right elbow.

On April 3, 2021, Saensatharn faced Nicolas Mendes at THAI FIGHT Nan. After getting dropped early by a right uppercut from Mendes, he would be knocked out in the first round with a right knee from the clinch.

Titles and accomplishments 
THAI FIGHT 
 2017 THAI FIGHT King's Cup Champion (70 kg / 154 lb)
 2017 Isuzu Cup Superfight Champion (70 kg / 154 lb)
 20–2 record
World Muaythai Council (WMC) 
 2016 WMC Muay Thai World Welterweight Champion (67 kg / 147 lb)
Lumpinee Stadium 
 2014 Lumpinee Stadium Light Welterweight Champion (63.5 kg / 140 lb)
Professional Boxing Association of Thailand (PAT)
 2014 Thailand (PAT) Light Welterweight Champion (63.5 kg / 140 lb)

Muay Thai record

|-  style="background:#fbb;"
| 2021-04-03|| Loss ||align=left| Nicolas Mendes || THAI FIGHT Nan || Nan, Thailand || KO (Knee) || 1 ||
|- style="background:#cfc;"
| 2020-11-28|| Win ||align=left| Ruslan Ataev || THAI FIGHT Pluak Daeng || Rayong, Thailand || KO (Right Elbow) || 2 || 
|- style="background:#cfc;"
| 2020-11-07|| Win ||align=left| Herbert Kinscher || THAI FIGHT Korat 2020 || Nakhon Ratchasima, Thailand || TKO (3 Knockdowns) || 1 ||
|- style="background:#cfc;"
| 2020-10-17|| Win ||align=left| Mohammad Hossein Doroudian || THAI FIGHT Begins || Nonthaburi, Thailand || KO (Knee) || 2 ||
|- style="background:#cfc;"
| 2020-09-19|| Win ||align=left| Andi Uustalu || THAI FIGHT New Normal || Bangkok, Thailand || TKO (Doctor stoppage) || 3 ||
|- style="background:#cfc;"
| 2019-06-29|| Win ||align=left| David McCarthy || THAI FIGHT Betong || Betong, Thailand || TKO (Doctor stoppage) || 2 ||
|-  style="background:#fbb;"
| 2019-03-30|| Loss ||align=left| Sasha Moisa || THAI FIGHT Mueang Khon 2019 || Nakhon Si Thammarat, Thailand || KO || 1 ||
|- style="background:#cfc;"
| 2019-02-23|| Win||align=left| Kurtis Allen || THAI FIGHT Phuket 2019 || Phuket, Thailand || KO || 1 ||
|- style="background:#cfc;"
| 2018-11-24|| Win ||align=left| Ruslan Ataev || THAI Saraburi 2018 || Saraburi, Thailand || KO || 2 ||
|- style="background:#cfc;"
| 2018-10-27|| Win ||align=left| Hosein Nasiri || THAI FIGHT Chiangrai 2018 || Chiang Rai, Thailand || KO || 1 ||
|- style="background:#cfc;"
| 2018-08-25|| Win ||align=left| Fabian Hundt || THAI FIGHT Rayong 2018 || Rayong, Thailand || Decision || 3 || 3:00
|- style="background:#cfc;"
| 2018-07-07|| Win ||align=left| Pascal Schroth || THAI FIGHT Hat Yai 2018 || Hat Yai, Thailand || KO || 1 ||
|- style="background:#cfc;"
| 2018-05-12|| Win ||align=left| Mostafa Ashouri || THAI FIGHT Samui 2018 || Ko Samui, Thailand || KO || 1 ||
|- style="background:#cfc;"
| 2018-04-21|| Win ||align=left| Luca Tagliarno || THAI FIGHT Rome || Rome, Italy || TKO (Doctor stoppage) || 3 ||
|- style="background:#cfc;"
| 2018-03-24|| Win ||align=left| Long Sovandoeun || THAI FIGHT Mueang Khon 2018 || Nakhon Si Thammarat, Thailand || KO || 1 ||
|- style="background:#cfc;"
| 2018-01-27|| Win ||align=left| Naimjon Tuhtaboyev || THAI FIGHT Bangkok 2017 || Bangkok, Thailand || Decision || 3 || 3:00
|-
! style=background:white colspan=9 |
|- style="background:#cfc;"
| 2017-12-23|| Win ||align=left| Walid Otmane || THAI FIGHT Chiang Mai || Chiang Mai, Thailand || Decision || 3 || 3:00
|- style="background:#cfc;"
| 2017-11-25|| Win ||align=left| Thiago Goulate|| THAI FIGHT Khmer || Phnom Penh, Cambodia || Decision || 3 || 3:00
|- style="background:#cfc;"
| 2017-09-30|| Win ||align=left| Killian Gimenez || THAI FIGHT Barcelona || Barcelona, Spain || KO || 3 ||
|- style="background:#cfc;"
| 2017-07-15|| Win ||align=left| Long Sophy || THAI FIGHT: We Love Yala || Yala, Thailand || TKO (Referee stoppage) || 1 ||
|- style="background:#cfc;"
| 2017-05-27|| Win ||align=left| Johny Tancray|| THAI FIGHT Italy || Turin, Italy || KO || 1 ||
|- style="background:#cfc;"
| 2017-04-29|| Win ||align=left| Aroondej Petchsupapan ||  THAI FIGHT Samui 2017 || Ko Samui, Thailand || Decision || 3 || 3:00
|- style="background:#cfc;"
| 2017-01-14|| Win ||align=left| Raphael Rayepin || Topking World Series - TK12 || Hohhot, China || KO|| 1 ||
|-  style="background:#cfc;"
| 2016-12-17|| Win ||align=left| Capitan Petchyindee Academy || Omnoi Stadium || Bangkok, Thailand || Decision || 5 || 3:00
|-  style="background:#fbb;"
| 2016-08-23|| Loss ||align=left| Manasak Sitniwat || Lumpinee Stadium || Bangkok, Thailand || Decision || 5 || 3:00
|- style="background:#cfc;"
| 2016-07-03 || Win ||align=left| Lek EiwaSportsGym || BOM12 - The Battle Of Muay Thai 12 - || Yokohama, Japan || Decision (Unanimous) || 5 || 3:00 
|-
! style=background:white colspan=9|
|- style="background:#cfc;"
| 2016-05-19 || Win ||align=left| Dylan Salvador || Capital Fights || Paris, France || Decision || 5 || 3:00 
|-
! style=background:white colspan=9|
|- style="background:#cfc;"
| 2016-05-10 || Win ||align=left| Nontakit Sor.Jor.Lekmuangnont || Lumpinee Stadium || Bangkok, Thailand || Decision || 5 || 3:00
|-  style="background:#fbb;"
| 2016-04-06 || Loss ||align=left| Littewada Sitthikul ||  || Chiang Mai, Thailand || KO || 4 ||
|-  style="background:#fbb;"
| 2015-10-05 || Loss ||align=left| Yodwicha Por Boonsit || Rajadamnern Stadium || Bangkok, Thailand || Decision || 5 || 3:00
|- style="background:#cfc;"
| 2015-06-30 || Win ||align=left| Yodwicha Por Boonsit || Lumpinee Stadium || Bangkok, Thailand || Decision || 5 || 3:00
|- style="background:#cfc;"
| 2015-04-29|| Win ||align=left| Manasak Sitniwat  || Rajadamnern Stadium || Bangkok, Thailand || Decision || 5 || 3:00
|-  style="background:#fbb;"
| 2014-12-24|| Loss ||align=left| Yodwicha Por Boonsit  || Rajadamnern Stadium || Bangkok, Thailand || Decision || 5 || 3:00
|-  style="background:#c5d2ea;"
| 2014-11-15|| Draw ||align=left| Dylan Salvador || Topking World Series || Montigny-le-Bretonneux, France || Decision || 3 || 3:00
|-  style="background:#fbb;"
| 2014-09-05|| Loss ||align=left| Singdam Kiatmuu9  || Lumpinee Stadium || Bangkok, Thailand || Decision || 5 || 3:00
|-
! style=background:white colspan=9|
|- style="background:#cfc;"
| 2014-07-08|| Win ||align=left| Petchboonchu FA Group || Lumpinee Stadium || Bangkok, Thailand || Decision || 5 || 3:00
|-  style="background:#cfc;"
| 2014-06- || Win ||align=left| Chamuaktong Fightermuaythai || Lumpinee Stadium || Bangkok, Thailand || Decision || 5 || 3:00
|-
! style=background:white colspan=9 |
|-  style="background:#cfc;"
| 2014-03-15 || Win ||align=left| Yutachai Kiatpatarapan || Ladprao Stadium || Bangkok, Thailand || KO (Knees)||  ||
|-  style="background:#cfc;"
| 2013-11-26 || Win ||align=left| Aranchai Pran26 || Lumpinee Stadium || Bangkok, Thailand || Decision || 5 || 3:00
|-  style="background:#fbb;"
| 2013- || Loss ||align=left| Saksongkram Popteeratham || Omnoi Stadium, Weber Tournament || Samut Sakhon, Thailand || Decision || 5 || 3:00
|-  style="background:#cfc;"
| 2013-11-02 || Win ||align=left| Phetmongkon Sor.Khamsing || Omnoi Stadium, Weber Tournament || Samut Sakhon, Thailand || Decision || 5 || 3:00
|-  style="background:#fbb;"
| 2013- || Loss ||align=left| Chamophet Phetkasem || Omnoi Stadium, Weber Tournament || Samut Sakhon, Thailand || Decision || 5 || 3:00
|-  style="background:#cfc;"
| 2013- || Win ||align=left| Daoprakay Nor.Siriphung || Omnoi Stadium, Weber Tournament || Samut Sakhon, Thailand || Decision || 5 || 3:00
|-  style="background:#cfc;"
| 2013- || Win ||align=left| Manasak Sitniwat || Omnoi Stadium, Weber Tournament || Samut Sakhon, Thailand || KO ||  ||
|-  style="background:#fbb;"
| 2013-03-26 || Loss ||align=left| Tuantong Phumpanmuang || Lumpinee Stadium || Bangkok, Thailand || TKO (Doctor Stoppage)|| 3 ||
|-
! style=background:white colspan=9 |
|-  style="background:#cfc;"
| 2013-02-26 || Win||align=left| Petchsanguan Sor.Yupinda || Lumpinee Stadium || Bangkok, Thailand || Decision || 5 || 3:00
|-  style="background:#cfc;"
| 2013-01-25 || Win||align=left| Seansak Phetbancha || Lumpinee Stadium || Bangkok, Thailand || Decision || 5 || 3:00
|-  style="background:#cfc;"
| 2012-11-16 || Win||align=left| Manasak Sitniwat || Lumpinee Stadium || Bangkok, Thailand || KO (Left Knee) ||  ||
|-  style="background:#fbb;"
| 2012-08-17 || Loss ||align=left| Wacharachai Rachanon || Lumpinee Stadium || Bangkok, Thailand || Decision || 5 || 3:00
|- style="background:#cfc;"
| 2012-07-10 || Win ||align=left| Tanachai Chor. Pradit || Lumpinee Stadium || Bangkok, Thailand || Decision || 5 || 3:00
|- style="background:#cfc;"
| 2012-06-13 || Win ||align=left| Playnoy Porpaoin || Rajadamnern Stadium || Bangkok, Thailand || Decision || 5 || 3:00
|- style="background:#cfc;"
| 2011-10-14 || Win ||align=left| Yodphet Wor. Sangprapai || Lumpinee Stadium || Bangkok, Thailand || Decision || 5 || 3:00
|- style="background:#cfc;"
| 2011-06-17 || Win ||align=left| Tewalith Sitsongpeenong || Lumpinee Stadium || Bangkok, Thailand || TKO (Knees)|| 4 ||
|-  style="background:#fbb;"
| 2011-01-14 || Loss ||align=left| Kwanaik Kiatkamphon || Lumpinee Stadium || Bangkok, Thailand || Decision || 5 || 3:00
|-  style="background:#fbb;"
| 2010-12-09 || Loss ||align=left| Thepnimit Sitmonchai || Rajadamnern Stadium || Bangkok, Thailand || KO (Left Hook)|| 2 ||
|-  style="background:#fbb;"
| 2010-02-07 || Loss ||align=left| Petnabee Sevenfarm || Aswindam stadium ||  Thailand || Decision || 5 || 3:00
|-  style="background:#fbb;"
| 2009-06-12|| Loss ||align=left| Yardfa Wor. Kaewkraison || Lumpinee Stadium || Bangkok, Thailand || TKO || 3 ||
|-
| colspan=9 | Legend:

References

External links
 Saensatharn P.K. Saenchai Muaythai Gym at THAI FIGHT

1993 births
Living people
Middleweight kickboxers
Welterweight kickboxers
Saensatharn P.K. Saenchai Muaythaigym
Saensatharn P.K. Saenchai Muaythaigym